is an interchange passenger railway station located in the city of Ayabe, Kyoto Prefecture, Japan, operated by West Japan Railway Company (JR West). The station serves limited expresses "Kinosaki", Maizuru" and Hashidate".

Lines

Station layout
The station consists of one ground-level island platform and one side platform connected by a footbridge. The station is staffed.

Platforms

Adjacent stations

|-
!colspan=5|West Japan Railway Company (JR West)

History
Ayabe Station opened on November 3, 1904. With the privatization of the Japan National Railways (JNR) on April 1, 1987, the station came under the aegis of the West Japan Railway Company.

Passenger statistics
In fiscal 2016, the station was used by an average of 3180 passengers daily (boarding passengers only)

Surrounding area
 Gunze head office
 Ayabe City Hall

See also
List of railway stations in Japan

External links
JR Oddekake.net - Ayabe station information 

Railway stations in Japan opened in 1904
Railway stations in Kyoto Prefecture
Sanin Main Line
Ayabe, Kyoto